Valle dell'Angelo is a town and comune in the province of Salerno in the Campania region of south-western Italy. 
The name translates as "Valley of the Angel" and the comune contains La Grotta dell'Angelo (the Cave of the Angel). The cave safeguards the statue of the Archangel Michael, shown in defensive posture.

See also
Pruno Cilento
Cilento

References

External links

Comune of Valle dell'Angelo
Valle dell'Angelo - History, Culture & Genealogy

Cities and towns in Campania
Localities of Cilento